Szollosi, Szőllősi or Szöllősi is a Hungarian surname. Notable people with the surname include:

Balázs Szöllősi (born 1992), Hungarian handballer
Ilona Szöllősi (1908–??), Hungarian gymnast, competitor in the 1928 Summer Olympics
Imre Szöllősi (1941–2022), Hungarian sprint canoeist
Ivett Szöllősi (born 1982), Hungarian biathlete
Matt Szollosi (born 1972), American politician
Szabolcs Szöllősi (born 1989), Hungarian handballer
Szabolcs Szőllősi (born 1986), Hungarian speed skater
Szandra Szöllősi-Zácsik (born 1990), Hungarian handballer

Hungarian-language surnames